The Jeremy River (Saint Lucia) is a river of Saint Lucia. It drains from the forest area to the east coast.

See also
List of rivers of Saint Lucia

References

Rivers of Saint Lucia